Opango is a surname. Notable people with the surname include:

David Opango (born 1978), Burundian footballer
Joachim Yhombi-Opango (1939–2020), Congolese politician
Pauline Opango (1937–2014), Congolese activist and the wife of Patrice Lumumba